Kevin A. Mayer (born 1962) is an American business executive who is the co-founder and co-CEO of Candle Media, alongside Thomas O. Staggs, the former COO and CFO of The Walt Disney Company. Backed by Blackstone Inc., Candle Media acquired Hello Sunshine (founded by Reese Witherspoon) for $900 million, Moonbug Entertainment (the producer of CoCoMelon) for $3 billion, 10% of Westbrook (founded by Will Smith and Jada Pinkett Smith) for $60 million, and ATTN: for $100 million.

Mayer previously served as the CEO of TikTok and the COO of its parent company ByteDance Ltd. Prior to joining TikTok, Mayer was Chairman of Direct-to-Consumer at Disney, where he was responsible for launching Disney+, ESPN+, and Hulu+. Kevin managed over 25,000 employees around the world and over 60% of Disney revenues. He was also the Chief Strategy Officer of Disney, and led the acquisitions of Pixar, Marvel, Lucasfilm, and 21st Century Fox.

In addition to his role at Candle Media, Kevin serves as Chairman of DAZN Group and a co-founder and Managing Partner at Smash Capital, a growth stage venture capital firms with investments in Epic Games and Manscaped. He sits on the board of directors of Nexon, and is an advisor to David Zaslav of Warner Bros. Discovery, Len Blavatnik of Access Industries, and Marc Benioff of Salesforce.

Early life and education
Mayer earned a bachelor of science in mechanical engineering from the Massachusetts Institute of Technology (MIT) and a master of science in electrical engineering from San Diego State University, as well as an MBA from Harvard Business School.

Business career
In 1993, Mayer began working at The Walt Disney Company handling strategy and business development for Disney's Interactive/Internet and television businesses worldwide. He was later promoted to head the Disney Internet group as executive vice president.

Mayer was then named Chief Executive Officer of Playboy.com, the digital subsidiary of Chicago's Playboy Enterprises in February 2000. In September 2000, Mayer left Playboy and was appointed Chairman and Chief Executive Officer of Clear Channel Interactive, a division of Clear Channel Worldwide. He served in that position until December 2001. He joined L.E.K. Consulting as a partner and head of the global media and entertainment practice in February 2002.

Mayer rejoined Disney as Executive Vice President, Corporate Strategy, Business Development, and Technology in June 2005, then was designated in October 2005 as an executive officer. Mayer was involved with the purchases of BamTech Media, Pixar, Marvel Entertainment, Lucasfilm, Club Penguin and Maker Studios, as well as its agreement reached in December 2017 to acquire most of the 21st Century Fox assets. In 2010, he arranged the sale of Miramax to Filmyard Holdings.

In March 2018, Mayer was named chairman of Walt Disney Direct-to-Consumer & International, a new segment division, to head Disney's global streaming business, ad sales and distribution and the media and studio operations of the company. Mayer led the successful launches of Disney+ in 2019 and of ESPN+ in 2018, and led Hulu after Disney acquired majority ownership in 2019.

In May 2020, Mayer resigned from The Walt Disney Company to become COO of Chinese internet technology company ByteDance Ltd and CEO of its popular social media app TikTok. On August 26, Mayer announced that he would step down from both roles and leave ByteDance altogether, three months after taking the position. His decision was reported by the New York Times as due to the sharp changes in the political environment in which ByteDance was ordered to sell its U.S. operations by the Donald Trump administration, effectively eliminating the role Mayer had accepted, though the "imminent" sale was subsequently halted by the Chinese government, and White House attention to it waned.

In October 2020, he and Tom Staggs, also formerly of Disney, led the founding of special-purpose acquisition company (SPAC) Forest Road Acquisition Corp. The company began public trading on November 25, 2020 (NYSE:FRX), having raised over $300 million in capital, and having been joined by Shaquille O'Neal, Mark Burg, Martin Luther King III, and others. In February 2021, Forest Road Acquisition Corp. entered a 2.9 billion agreement to merge with Beachbody and Myx Fitness Holdings. On February 18, 2021, the company filed for an IPO for a second SPAC, Forest Road Acquisition Corp II (NYSE:FRXB), of which Mayer and Staggs will be co-chairs and co-CEOs. The new consumer-facing technology, media and telecommunications SPAC raised $350 million during its IPO.

In November 2020, Mayer joined Access Industries as a senior advisor. In March 2021, he was named chairman of the board of directors of its subsidiary DAZN Group, parent company of DAZN, a global sports streaming platform most active in European and Asian markets. On November 3, 2021, he became as a consultant of Discovery's streaming services.

References 

Living people
Harvard Business School alumni
Disney executives
MIT School of Engineering alumni
San Diego State University alumni
1962 births
People from Los Angeles
ByteDance people